Leucocarbo is a genus of birds in the family Phalacrocoracidae with the members commonly known as blue-eyed shags. This is a group of closely related cormorant taxa. Many have a blue, purple or red ring around the eye (not a blue iris); other shared features are white underparts (at least in some individuals) and pink feet.

They are found around the colder parts of the Southern Hemisphere, especially near southern South America, Antarctica, and New Zealand.  Many are endemic to remote islands.  Determining which types are species and which are subspecies of what larger species is problematic; various recent authorities have recognized from 8 to 14 species and have placed them in a variety of genera.  The common names are even more confusing, "like myriad footprints criss-crossing in the snow and about as easy to disentangle."  Only one common name is given for most species here.

Taxonomy
The genus Leucocarbo was introduced in 1856 by the French naturalist Charles Lucien Bonaparte. He did not specify a type species but this was designated as the Guanay cormorant by William Ogilvie-Grant in 1898. The name Leucocarbo combines the Ancient Greek leukos meaning "white" with the genus name Carbo introduced by Bernard Germain de Lacépède in 1799.

A molecular phylogenetic study published in 2014 found that Leucocarbo is sister to the American cormorants in the genus Nannopterum;  the genera split between 6.7 - 8.0 million years ago.

The genus contains 16 species:
Rock shag, Leucocarbo magellanicus
Guanay cormorant, Leucocarbo bougainvillii
Bounty shag, Leucocarbo ranfurlyi
New Zealand king shag or rough-faced shag, Leucocarbo carunculatus 
Chatham shag, Leucocarbo onslowi
Otago shag, Leucocarbo chalconotus
Foveaux shag, Leucocarbo stewarti
Auckland shag, Leucocarbo colensoi
Campbell shag, Leucocarbo campbelli
Imperial shag or blue-eyed shag, Leucocarbo atriceps
South Georgia shag, Leucocarbo georgianus
Crozet shag, Leucocarbo melanogenis
Antarctic shag, Leucocarbo bransfieldensis
Kerguelen shag, Leucocarbo verrucosus
Heard Island shag, Leucocarbo nivalis
Macquarie shag, Leucocarbo purpurascens

References

Leucocarbo
Taxa named by Charles Lucien Bonaparte